The Silver Line, also known as the Cotton Belt Rail Line, is an under construction  hybrid rail (light rail with some features similar to commuter rail) line traversing Collin, Dallas, and Tarrant Counties in the U.S. state of Texas operated by Dallas Area Rapid Transit. The line will provide service from Dallas's northeast suburbs of Plano, Richardson, and Addison to Dallas/Fort Worth International Airport Terminal B.

According to DART, the Silver Line is "designed to provide a high-speed, reliable transit option for residents and commuters with connections to the existing and planned transit systems" and aims to improve transit travel times by providing an alternative to congested roadway networks.

The working name for the project, the Cotton Belt Rail Line, comes from a former subsidiary of the Southern Pacific Railroad, the St. Louis Southwestern Railway, commonly known as the Cotton Belt, which previously owned the line. DART purchased the right-of-way in 1990 for future transit use.

History
Cotton Belt service along the line has been in planning since the original 1983 DART Service Plan. DART previously bought the right-of-way to the  Cotton Belt corridor train tracks in 1990 and freight trains had since ceased use of the tracks. The line was also included in DART's 2030 Transit System Plan. However, in 2010 DART scrapped much of their 2030 plan, citing deficits and drops in revenue. A proposal to use private funding to construct both the Dallas County and Tarrant County segments was considered, but this plan was abandoned after the Texas Legislature failed to enact legislation necessary to the plan during the 2013 state legislative session.

DART officials stated that without private funding options, the agency would not be able to build out the line until at least the mid-2030s. DART considered the possibility of using bus rapid transit as a less costly alternative for current funding.

DART announced in late August 2016 that the project could be fast tracked and completed by as early as 2022, after DART secured funds needed to complete the project. 

In late August 2018, the DART board voted to accept a plan which eliminated two previously-proposed stations, reducing the number of planned stations to 10.

On February 12, 2019, the DART board approved construction of a second track along the entire length of the line, which is anticipated to reduce wait times between commuter trains, avert delays during construction and maintenance, and better accommodate freight trains using the line. This design change is projected to cost $109 million, raising the design-build contract to its maximum allowable price of $923 million.

Construction commenced in 2019 after DART secured a $908 million Railroad Rehabilitation and Improvement Financing federal loan from November 2018 to pay for most of the projected $1.1 billion cost. To cover the remainder of the line's cost, DART has asked some cities to pick up a share of the tab to help pay for the costs of stations in places where the line diverts from the freight track's path. Service was initially scheduled to begin by December 28, 2022.

On June 24, 2019, DART announced that the line would be named the Silver Line, bringing the service under the same general branding as the agency's light rail system.

By 2020 the opening had slipped to March 2023, with further delays to 2024 announced the following year.

In January 2023, further delays placed the anticipated service date in late 2025 to mid-2026.

Operations
Service would be offered seven days per week, with more frequent service during weekday morning and evening peak periods.

It is proposed that trains would operate in both directions every 30 minutes during the peak travel periods on weekdays of 6:00 am – 9:00 am and 3:00 pm – 7:00 pm and every hour during the non-peak travel periods of 9:00 am – 3:00 pm and after 7:00 pm. Service on Saturday, Sunday, and major holidays would be from 8:00 am to 8:00 pm
operating in both directions every 60 minutes throughout the day.

The estimated one-way travel time from DART's Shiloh Road station to the DFW Airport/Terminal B station is 60 minutes (and 59 minutes in the opposite direction). These run times include station dwell times of 30 seconds at all stations except for Downtown Carrollton, Addison Transit Center, CityLine/Bush, and 12th Street, where dwell times are one minute.  Estimated travel time from the DART Orange Line CityLine/Bush station to DFW Airport station is approximately 1.5 hours as it requires travel through downtown Dallas.

Each train will be staffed by an engineer and a conductor. To allow for flexibility of assignments with a small overall staff, engineers and conductors will be cross-trained, certified, and qualified in both areas.

Freight
, four companies move freight along the corridor: the Fort Worth and Western Railroad; the Dallas, Garland and Northeastern Railroad; BNSF; and Kansas City Southern. The short line operations are limited to periods of non-peak passenger movements, but the Class I railroads are independently dispatched.

Planned route

Together, the line would connect with the Trinity Metro TEXRail commuter rail line at DFW North station providing access to Downtown Fort Worth, Grapevine, and various other Tarrant County locales.

The line would also connect with the Denton County Transportation Authority A-train commuter rail line providing access to various Denton County locales and DART's Green, Orange, and Red lines providing access to Dallas Love Field and Downtown Dallas via Downtown Carrollton or City Line/Bush stations.

In total, the alignment will traverse through three Counties including Tarrant, Dallas, and Collin Counties and seven cities including Grapevine, Coppell, Dallas, Carrollton, Addison, Richardson, and Plano.

Stations
All stations will be designed for accessibility. There are 10 under construction stations including:

Rolling stock

Eight Stadler FLIRT (Fast Light Intercity and Regional Train) diesel multiple unit (DMU) trainsets were ordered in June 2019 to operate on the Silver Line. This will make DART the fourth transit agency in Texas to use Stadler Rail DMUs, after orders for the Denton County Transportation Authority A-train, Capital MetroRail in Austin, and TEXRail. It is the third system in the United States to use FLIRT DMUs, TEXRail being the first, and the Arrow in San Bernardino County, California, being the second.

Downtown Wylie Extension 
An additional segment of the Cotton Belt corridor has been labeled for future expansion. Although no planning has occurred, it would extend the route from Shiloh Road in Plano to Wylie, with stations in the downtowns of Murphy and Wylie. Neither of these towns are DART member cities. The Environmental Impact Statement released in 2018 suggests that trains may eventually run along the TEXRail corridor to Fort Worth.

References

External links
DART Cotton Belt Regional Rail Corridor
Map of Proposed Route

Passenger rail transportation in Texas
Transportation in the Dallas–Fort Worth metroplex
Commuter rail in the United States
Proposed railway lines in Texas
Transportation in Fort Worth, Texas
2025 in rail transport
2026 in rail transport